Gavin Prout (born March 13, 1978 in Whitby, Ontario) is a Canadian professional lacrosse player who plays for the Colorado Mammoth in the National Lacrosse League, and formerly of the Hamilton Nationals in Major League Lacrosse. He was also a member of the Team Canada squad that won the gold medal during the 2006 World Lacrosse Championship.

Canadian Box career

Junior
Prout played for the Whitby Warriors of the OLA Junior A Lacrosse League. In 1997, Prout lead the Warriors to their first Minto Cup championship in 12 years. The following year, Prout was awarded the "Green Gael Trophy" for League M.V.P., scoring 49 goals and 125 points during the season. In 1999, Prout led the league in scoring with a career high 132 points, and led the Warriors to their second Minto Cup in three years. Prout was also given the "Dean McLeod Award" for Playoffs M.V.P. and the "B.W. Evans Award" for Top Graduating Player.

Prout finished his junior career with an outstanding 676 points (regular season and playoffs combined), ranking him 25th all time in Canadian Junior A lacrosse history. Prout is also ranked 21st all time in combined assists with 396.

Senior
Prout finished his first season in the MSL with 73 points, and helped the Brooklin Redmen to their first Mann Cup in ten years. Prout was awarded the "Gene Dopp Memorial Trophy" as Rookie of the Year.

College career
Prout started his collegiate career in Erie, PA playing at Mercyhurst College as a freshman until they dropped Men's Lacrosse as a Division 1 sport and Gannon University as a sophomore, until they also dropped Men's Lacrosse as a division 1 sport. Prout played collegiate lacrosse at Loyola College in Maryland, where he was named to the First-team All-American team as a senior.

Professional career
Prout was drafted first overall by the New York Saints in the 2001 National Lacrosse League entry draft.

As a rookie, Prout was named to the All-Rookie team as a member of the Saints.  Since joining the league, Prout has played in six NLL All-Star Games (2002, & 2004 - 2008).

Prout joined the Mammoth in 2004, and was named the captain of the Mammoth prior to the 2006 season. He was named the Championship game MVP when the Mammoth won the NLL championship in 2006.

In 2008, Prout led the National Lacrosse League in assists with 67, a career high. During the 2009 NLL season, he was named a reserve to the All-Star game.

In October 2009, Prout was traded along with Andrew Potter and two 2010 1st round draft selections to the Rochester Knighthawks for Ilija Gajic and their 2012 first round draft selection. Just two weeks later, Prout was once again traded with Dean Hill to the Edmonton Rush for two draft picks.

In March 2011, after playing a season and a half for Edmonton, Prout was traded back to the Mammoth.

Statistics

NCAA

MLL

NLL
Reference:

O.L.A. Jr.A

MSL

Awards

References

1978 births
Living people
Canadian lacrosse players
Colorado Mammoth players
Edmonton Rush players
Lacrosse people from Ontario
Loyola Greyhounds men's lacrosse players
Major League Lacrosse players
National Lacrosse League All-Stars
Sportspeople from Whitby, Ontario
Rochester Knighthawks players
Hamilton Nationals players